Darshan Misal (born 11 September 1992) is an Indian first-class cricketer who plays for Goa. He was the leading wicket-taker for Goa in the 2017–18 Ranji Trophy, with 14 dismissals in six matches.

References

External links
 

1992 births
Living people
Indian cricketers
Goa cricketers
Cricketers from Goa
People from South Goa district